Binnaz Uslu (born March 12, 1985 in Ankara) is a retired Turkish middle-distance and long-distance runner. She was banned from sport for life in 2014, after her second doping violation. 

Uslu was a student at the Gazi University in Ankara.

She participated at the 2005 Mediterranean Games in Almería and won a bronze medal in 800 m with 2:02.68. In the 4×400 metres relay, she won another bronze medal with her teammates Özge Gürler, Birsen Bekgöz and Pınar Saka in 3:40.75 minutes. In 2006 at the 13th SPAR European Cross Country Championships in San Giorgio su Legnano, Italy she won the gold medal in the under 23 section.

She won the silver medal at the 2010 European Cross Country Championships behind Jessica Augusto.

Doping 
Uslu failed a drug test for doping taken by the IAAF during a camp in Antalya, Turkey on March 13, 2007. She was banned from athletics from March 2007 to March 2009. Her coach Yahya Sevüktekin was also banned.

In 2014, she was banned from sport for life after the IAAf re-analyzed a sample she had given at the 2011 IAAF World Athletics Championships in Daegu.

International competitions

Personal bests
1000 m: 2:41.79 NR junior (2006)
1500 m: 4:11.36 (2010)
3000 m: 9:06.82 (2010)
3000 m steeplechase: 9:24.06 NR (2011)
5000 m: 15:57.21 (2005)
10,000 m: 34:34.79 (2006)

See also
List of doping cases in athletics

References

1985 births
Living people
Sportspeople from Ankara
Turkish female middle-distance runners
Turkish female steeplechase runners
Olympic athletes of Turkey
Athletes (track and field) at the 2004 Summer Olympics
Athletes (track and field) at the 2012 Summer Olympics
World Athletics Championships athletes for Turkey
Turkish sportspeople in doping cases
Doping cases in athletics
Enkaspor athletes
Gazi University alumni
Mediterranean Games bronze medalists for Turkey
Athletes (track and field) at the 2005 Mediterranean Games
Universiade medalists in athletics (track and field)
Mediterranean Games medalists in athletics
Universiade gold medalists for Turkey
Universiade silver medalists for Turkey
Medalists at the 2005 Summer Universiade
Medalists at the 2011 Summer Universiade
21st-century Turkish women